Maurice O’Connell (died. 1 April 2019) was the governor of the Central Bank of Ireland in 1994, he retired in 2002 and before that he represented Ireland on the ECB Governing Council until 2001.

Maurice O’Connell, a kerryman banker and civil servants was born 5 May 1936, in Moyvane. His parents Thomas and Mary O'Connell were both teachers. He did St Michael's College Listowel, a school his grandfather taught for  50 years and were founding member. He went on to attend Brendan's College Killarney and also graduated from the Maynooth Ecclesiastical College. He obtained his MA classics in the University College Dublin. Maurice O’Connell just as to follow his parents footsteps, he embarked in the same career, teaching. He started teaching in International College St Gallen, Switzerland for some and he returned to Dublin, Ireland which became his living place, he joined the civil service in Dublin with much of it he spent in the Department of Finance. He did serves as the administrative officer in 1962 and rose to become the secretary in charge of the Finance Division. He also became member of the European Union Monetary Committee in 1998 until the summer of 1994.

Contribution in Irish Finance 
During Irish pound criss in 1992, he leads role in defending the currency making mortgage rates rise 16pc, during devaluation and international trade which Ireland battled in the unit of the money to be replaced with euro. The change over took only one week into the new currency euro and banknotes and coin were vast for transaction in the country that was in 2002. That alone make the government extending his term in office for the transition. Only €129.4million in banknotes and €970million in coin was distributed in preparation, the Irish pound and euro in circulation had to be overseen in the first one and half months of 2002. He was among the founding governor of the European Central Bank leading role in the productions of banknotes and implementing several pieces of legislation.

After retirement within some years he was made to commission review of the 18.7bn National Pension Reserve Fund by the government after recently market volatility.

Personal life 
He was married to Marjorie Treacy with four children, two son and two daughters.

References

External links 

 

1936 births
2019 deaths
Alumni of St Patrick's College, Maynooth
Governors of the Central Bank of Ireland
20th-century Irish economists
Executive Board of the European Central Bank members
Alumni of University College Dublin